The Perișani is a right tributary of the river Suhu in Romania. It flows into the Suhu near Băleni.

References

Rivers of Romania
Rivers of Galați County